Crassispira cerithina is a species of sea snail, a marine gastropod mollusk in the family Pseudomelatomidae.

Kantor et al. showed in 2017 that this species actually forms a species complex and recognized two new species; Crassispira aurea and Crassispira procera

Description
The length of the shell varies between 15 mm and 24 mm.

The shell is dark chocolate, covered by rows of lighter colored granulations, caused by the decussation of small flexuous rather numerous longitudinal ribs and elevated revolving lines. The aperture is light chocolate.

Distribution

References

  Anton, H.E. 1838. Verzeichniss der Conchylien welche sich in der Sammlung von Hermann Eduard Anton befinden. Halle : Eduard Anton xvi + 110 pp.
 Reeve, L.A. 1843. Monograph of the genus Pleurotoma. pls 1–18 in Reeve, L.A. (ed.). Conchologica Iconica. London : L. Reeve & Co. Vol. 1.
 Hedley, C. 1922. A revision of the Australian Turridae. Records of the Australian Museum 13(6): 213–359, pls 42–56
 Powell, A.W.B. 1967. The family Turridae in the Indo-Pacific. Part 1a. The Turrinae concluded. Indo-Pacific Mollusca 1(7): 409-443, pls 298-317
 Springsteen, F.J. & Leobrera, F.M. 1986. Shells of the Philippines. Manila : Carfel Seashell Museum 377 pp., 100 pls.
 Wilson, B. 1994. Australian marine shells. Prosobranch gastropods. Kallaroo, WA : Odyssey Publishing Vol. 2 370 pp.

External links
 
 

cerithina
Gastropods described in 1840